The 11th edition of the African Amateur Boxing Championships were held in Port Louis, Mauritius from 14 May to 20 May 2001. The event was organised by the African governing body for amateur boxing, the African Boxing Confederation (ABC).

Medal winners

See also
Boxing at the 1999 All-Africa Games

References
Amateur Boxing

2001
Boxing
African Boxing Championships
Boxing
African Amateur Boxing Championships
21st century in Port Louis
Sport in Port Louis